Common tone may refer to:

Common tone (chord)
Common tone (scale)
Common tone diminished seventh chord

See also
Common chord (disambiguation)